This is a list of large or well-known interstate or international companies in the Norwalk, Connecticut area. Norwalk is home to a Fortune 500 company, Emcor.

Companies currently headquartered in Norwalk, Connecticut

Publishing
Abaris Books
The Daily Voice (U.S. hyperlocal news)
Easton Press

Travel
Booking Holdings
HEI Hotels & Resorts
Priceline.com
Tower Optical

Financial
Danbury Mint
FactSet
Financial Accounting Foundation

Accessories
Dooney & Bourke

Technology
Applera
Datto (company)
Emcor
Frontier Communications
North American Power
Media Storm
Ventus (wireless company)
Xerox
Potoo Solutions

Food
Pepperidge Farm
Sclafani Foods
Stew Leonard's

References

 
Norwalk